Joe Fleet (1903 or 1904 – death date unknown) was an American Negro league pitcher . 

Fleet honed his baseball skills at Leavenworth Federal Penitentiary in the 1920s. He played for the prison's African American team, known as the "Booker T's", a team that produced three other future Negro leaguers: Roy Tyler, Albert Street, and David Wingfield. Fleet was paroled to the Chicago American Giants in 1930, and pitched in one game for manager Jim Brown, and may have also played briefly for the Memphis Red Sox that season.

References

External links
 and Seamheads

Year of birth missing
Year of death missing
Place of birth missing
Place of death missing
Chicago American Giants players
Baseball pitchers